Jessie Creek Winery is a winery in the Dias Creek section of Middle Township (mailing address is Cape May Court House) in Cape May County, New Jersey. The vineyard was first planted in 2002, and opened to the public in 2012. Jessie Creek has 5 acres of grapes under cultivation, and produces 1,200 cases of wine per year. The winery's name is an amalgamation of Jessie, the name of the former owner's mother, and Dias Creek.

Wines
Jessie Creek Winery is in the Outer Coastal Plain AVA, and produces wines from Cabernet Sauvignon, Chambourcin, Chardonnay, Concord, Merlot and Pinot gris grapes. Jessie Creek also makes fruit wines from  cranberries.

Features, licensing and associations
Since 2010, the winery has operated a 4-suite bed and breakfast in an 1846 farmhouse. Jessie Creek has a plenary winery license from the New Jersey Division of Alcoholic Beverage Control, which allows it to produce an unrestricted amount of wine, operate up to 15 off-premises sales rooms, and ship up to 12 cases per year to consumers in-state or out-of-state. The winery is a member of the Garden State Wine Growers Association and the Outer Coastal Plain Vineyard Association.

See also 
Alcohol laws of New Jersey
American wine
Judgment of Princeton
List of wineries, breweries, and distilleries in New Jersey
New Jersey Farm Winery Act
New Jersey Wine Industry Advisory Council
New Jersey wine

References

External links 
Garden State Wine Growers Association
Outer Coastal Plain Vineyard Association

Wineries in New Jersey
Tourist attractions in Cape May County, New Jersey
2012 establishments in New Jersey
Bed and breakfasts in New Jersey
Middle Township, New Jersey